Huffman House may refer to:

in the United States (by state then city)
Dr. George Huffman House, Florence, Arizona, listed on the National Register of Historic Places (NRHP) in Pinal County
Huffman House (Lancaster, Kentucky), listed on the NRHP in Garrard County
William Huffman Cobblestone House, Phelps, New York, listed on the NRHP in Ontario County
George Huffman Farm, Conover, North Carolina, listed on the NRHP in Catawba County
Warlick-Huffman Farm, Propst Crossroads, North Carolina, listed on the NRHP in Catawba County 
Hanitch-Huffman House, Dayton, Ohio, listed on the NRHP in Dayton
Huffman House (Newport, Virginia), listed on the NRHP in Craig County

de:Howard School